The Counter Narcotics Police of Afghanistan (CNPA) was a specialist force under the command of the Afghan National Police to conduct investigations and operations in Afghanistan related to narotics. The CNPA was assisted by American/British police officers with international special force units.

Candidates for the 5-week long Counter Narcotics Course must have completed an 8-week basic police course and are carefully selected.

Structure
The CNPA was based in Kabul and is made up of six departments/directorates, which included various provincial and specialist units:

Command Structure
 CNPA Director General
 Tactical Operations Center
 CNPA HQ Intelligence Department
 Specialized Unit Directorate
 National Interdiction Unit
 Provincial Directorate
 Laboratory
 Special Guard Force/Detention

Provincial Structure
 Interior Minister
 Deputy Minister-Counternarcotics/Deputy Minister-Security 
 ANP Provincial Chiefs of Police (under DM-S)
 CNPA Director General
 CNPA Provincial Directorate
 34 Provincial Units

References

Defunct law enforcement agencies of Afghanistan
Organizations disestablished in the 2020s